Ray McCoy may refer to:
 Ray McCoy (footballer)
 Ray McCoy (radio personality)